Isei Otsuka (大塚 惟精, Ōtsuka Isei, December 11, 1884 – August 6, 1945) was a Japanese politician who served as governor of Hiroshima Prefecture from April to June 1945. He was also governor of Tochigi Prefecture (1924–1926), Fukuoka Prefecture (1926–1927) and Ishikawa Prefecture (1927). He was killed in the atomic bombing of Hiroshima.

References

Governors of Hiroshima
1884 births
1945 deaths
Japanese Home Ministry government officials
Governors of Tochigi Prefecture
Governors of Fukuoka Prefecture
Governors of Ishikawa Prefecture
Deaths by airstrike during World War II
Japanese civilians killed in World War II
Deaths by American airstrikes
Hibakusha